SITI: An Iconic Exhibition of Dato' Siti Nurhaliza was a month-long fundraising exhibition of paintings and artworks that were inspired by the achievements made by Malaysian recording artist, Siti Nurhaliza. With 17 artworks from 15 Malaysian, one Spanish and one Iranian artists, the show was one of the events that is a part of Siti Nurhaliza's effort to raise funds for her foundation, Yayasan Nurjiwa. The artworks showcased range from paintings, sculptures, calligraphies, new media arts, stencil arts and mixed media arts. The exhibition is among the first of its kind in Malaysia where the main subject of the exhibition is a pop star.

Launched on 27 February, the gallery was opened to public until 26 March 2014.

Background and development

The project was a collaboration between Artelier Gallery and Siti Nurhaliza Productions as a fundraiser for Yayasan Nurjiwa a charity foundation founded by Siti and her husband, Datuk Khalid. The exhibition is a continuation of Siti's effort to raise funds for her foundation after her January 2014 concert, "Dato Siti Nurhaliza Live in Concert - Where the Heart is". Another objective of the exhibition was also to bring the public closer to the fine arts, through Siti Nurhaliza, a Malaysian icon.

The exhibition project began several months earlier, when Artelier Gallery started to scout for potential artists who have different approaches in producing their own artworks. Overall, 17 artists were finally selected to participate in the art exhibition - 15 Malaysians, one Spanish and one Iranian. Once the artists have been chosen, each of them was given a chance to personally meet and interview Siti before starting to produce their own artworks based on their takes on Siti. Based on the artists' medium of preference, the artworks exhibited range in style - paintings, sculptures, calligraphies, new media arts, stencil arts and mixed media arts.

All paintings that were showcased were up for sale, ranging in price, from RM 1 500 to RM 75 000 apiece. As much as 30 percent of total sales grossed from the paintings that have been sold will be channelled to Yayasan Nurjiwa.

The exhibition is among the first of its kind in Malaysia, in which the sole main subject is a pop star.

Artworks
Amongst the known artworks exhibited are:

Artists
 Adrian Torres, Spain
 Amirfirdaus Tarmizi, Malaysia
 Arikwibowo Amril, Malaysia
 Azizi Latif, Malaysia
 Badruddin Syah Abdul Wahab, Malaysia
 E. M. Nightwatcher, Iran
 Faiz Yunus, Malaysia
 Muhammad Firdaus Mahadi, Malaysia
 Haafiz Shahimi, Malaysia
 Haffendi Anuar, Malaysia
 Khairul Arshad, Malaysia
 Muhammad Syahbandi Samat, Malaysia
 Nazmi Ismail, Malaysia
 Sabihis Md. Pandi, Malaysia
 Scott & Dhameer Abbas, Malaysia
 Shafiq Nordin, Malaysia
 Zizan Rozman, Malaysia

Source:

Reception
Among the artworks that received the most attention were the artworks created by Badruddin Shah Abdul Wahab, Firdaus Mahadi and Khairul Arshad, where they were all valued at RM6 000, RM5 000 and RM5 500 respectively apiece.

See also
 Siti Nurhaliza
 2014 in Malaysia

Explanatory notes

References

External links
 
 Official Photo Gallery - Part 1
 Official Photo Gallery - Part 2

Visual arts exhibitions
2014 in Malaysia
2014 in art
Cultural depictions of Siti Nurhaliza